Justice Bailey may refer to:

John O. Bailey (1880–1959), chief justice of the Oregon Supreme Court
Joseph M. Bailey (1833–1895), chief justice of the Illinois Supreme Court
Lawrence Dudley Bailey (1819–1891), associate justice of the Kansas Supreme Court
Levin C. Bailey (c. 1892–1952), judge of the Maryland Court of Appeals

See also
Judge Bailey (disambiguation)